Meadowmont is a mixed-use community in Chapel Hill, North Carolina, which contains the Meadowmont House and Meadowmont Village, among other notable locations, in addition to residential areas, shopping, and office space and has been profiled in recent years in local periodicals such as Chapel Hill Magazine.

History 
There was considerable controversy about the development of this community.  Ground was officially broken in 1999 after 8 years of planning.

Meadowmont House 

The Meadowmont House, built in 1933 by David St. Pierre DuBose and Valinda Hill DuBose, was one of the first private homes in the United States equipped with central air conditioning. The Georgian Revival style manor house consists of a -story main block with -story flanking wings connected by -story hyphens. It is a steel frame and concrete building with a brick veneer.  The front facade features a two-story portico and Palladian window.  Associated with the house are eight contributing buildings and three contributing structures including: the play house; pool house and pool; the vegetable garden; garage; well house; poultry house; and stable.

It was listed on the National Register of Historic Places in 1985 by the National Park Service of the United States Department of the Interior as a national historic district.  The community was subsequently named for this property.

The Rizzo Conference Center of UNC Chapel Hill's Kenan-Flagler Business School, which also includes other buildings, incorporates this historic property.

Meadowmont Village 
Meadowmont Village is a shopping center built and located in Meadowmont and is an example of New Urbanist architecture.

References

External links 
 http://meadowmont.net/about/ 
 http://www.yelp.com/biz/meadowmont-village-chapel-hill
 http://www.rizzoconferencecenter.com/
 http://www.visitnc.com/listing/meadowmont-village
 http://www.bellapartmentliving.com/NC/Raleigh/Bell-Meadowmont/

Chapel Hill-Carrboro, North Carolina
New Urbanism communities
Houses on the National Register of Historic Places in North Carolina
Georgian Revival architecture in North Carolina
Houses completed in 1933
Houses in Durham County, North Carolina
National Register of Historic Places in Durham County, North Carolina
Historic districts on the National Register of Historic Places in North Carolina